Mugraha is a Gram Panchayat village located in  Rudhauli Tehsil in Basti district in the Rudhauli Vidhan Sabha constituency and Basti Lok Sabha constituency. It has a population of 1,592 people.

There are four villages In Mugraha Gram Panchayat.
 Mugraha
 Ladwa
 Tahir Jot
 Chandra Bhan Pur

Geography 
Mungraha is located at

Language 
Languages spoken in Mungraha include Awadhi in western areas and Bhojpuri in the eastern side. The district Basti may be considered as the demarcation of the languages Awadhi and Hindi. In city, due to increase in educated population, khari boli of Hindi is also observed in daily conversations.

References

Villages in Basti district